The Rochester Institute of Technology Press (often referred to as the RIT Press) is a university press affiliated with Rochester Institute of Technology, in Rochester, New York. The presswhich is currently a member of the Association of University Pressespublishes between 8-12 titles annually and is operated by the RIT Libraries.

The press has its origin in the RIT Cary Graphic Arts Press, which was an "experimental academic press" founded in 2001 by David Pankow (former curator of the Cary Graphic Arts Collection). In 2007, the press introduced the "RIT Press" imprint, which eventually subsumed the university's other imprints in 2013.

Publications

Book series
Notable book series published by the press include the following:
 "Press Arts & Crafts Movement"
 "Graphic Design Archives Chapbook"
 "Comics Studies Monograph Series"
 "Printing History"
 "Print Industry Center Monograph Series"

See also

 List of English-language book publishing companies
 List of university presses

References

External links 
RIT Press

RIT Press
Oregon